State Route 689 (SR 689) is a north–south state highway in the southern portion of the U.S. state of Ohio.

Route description
SR 689 passes through two counties along its path, Vinton and Meigs.  This state highway is not included within the National Highway System.

History
SR 689 first appeared in 1937 along the routing that it currently occupies. Originally, its northern terminus was at a two-lane SR 346, the predecessor to SR 32. In the early 1970s, the construction of the Appalachian Highway (originally numbered SR 346 at its completion, later renumbered to SR 32) truncated the highway very slightly at its northern terminus. No other major changes have occurred to the routing since then.

Major intersections

References

689
Transportation in Vinton County, Ohio
Transportation in Meigs County, Ohio